The Queen Elizabeth II September 11th Garden is located in Hanover Square in the Financial District of Lower Manhattan, New York City.  It commemorates the Commonwealth victims of the September 11, 2001, attack on the World Trade Center. It was officially opened by Queen Elizabeth II on July 6, 2010.

History
Originally planned as The British Memorial Garden, it was officially named The British Garden at Hanover Square by Prince Harry on May 29, 2009. On May 2, 2012, it was renamed the Queen Elizabeth II September 11th Garden at a rededication ceremony led by the Dean of Westminster Abbey. This was to include victims of other Commonwealth countries who died in the September 11 attacks.

Design
The original idea for the garden came from Isabel and Julian Bannerman.  Lynden Miller and Ronda M. Brands, both garden designers, later helped choose and plan the layout of plants and shrubs for the space.

References

External links

British Memorial Garden — Hanover Square at New York City Department of Parks and Recreation
Westminster Abbey press release

2010 sculptures
British terrorism victims
Financial District, Manhattan
Foreign relations of the Commonwealth of Nations
Gardens in New York (state)
Memorials for the September 11 attacks
Monuments and memorials in Manhattan
Parks in Manhattan
2010 establishments in New York City